Gaursons India Private Limited (GIL) is based in Delhi/NCR, India. It was incorporated in the year 1995 as a private limited company and was later on converted into public limited company in year 2000. The company was founded by B.L. Gaur in the year 1995. Manoj Gaur is the Managing Director of the company. Till date the company has done more than 5.5 
million Sqft of real estate development in Delhi NCR region particularly in Noida, Ghaziabad and Yamuna Expressway region. They have delivered 65+ projects including both residential and commercial. The company and its subsidiaries are currently executing 17 residential projects and 13 commercial projects.
Gaursons has also developed township project named Gaur City in Greater Noida West which is today home to almost 25000 families. 
In 2014 Gaursons launched a township project named Gaur Yamuna City which was launched by Bollywood stars Rishi Kapoor and Neetu Kapoor on Yamuna Expressway on the land purchased from Jaypee Group.

References

External links 
 Official website
 Gaurs The Islands
 Gaurs Aero Suites
 Gaur City Center
 Gaur Properties

Real estate companies of India
1995 establishments in India